Robert Hansen (born 5 October 1979 in Hvidovre) is a Danish actor and television host, best known for his roles in the films Kærlighed ved første hik (1999) and Oldboys (2009), and the TV show Langt fra Las Vegas.

References

External links 
 

Danish male television actors
Danish male film actors
20th-century Danish male actors
21st-century Danish male actors
Living people
1979 births
People from Hvidovre Municipality